Composer of the Week is a long-running biographical music programme produced by BBC Cymru Wales and broadcast on BBC Radio 3.

It is broadcast daily from Monday to Friday at 12 noon for an hour, each week's programmes being a self-contained series of five dedicated to a particular composer or a group of related composers. With the "great composers", weeks dedicated to them tend to focus on a particular aspect of their life or works. The series has been written and presented by Donald Macleod since 1999. Sometimes recordings are made on location with Macleod visiting composers at home - such as the Harrison Birtwistle episodes in October 2019.

History
Originally titled This Week's Composer, the series was first broadcast on 2 August 1943 on the BBC Home Service, running from 7.30am to 7.55am, Monday to Saturday. There were some breaks in the schedule: for instance, Music Diary was used as a replacement from January to March 1945. But in terms of longevity, it is only surpassed by Desert Island Discs (first heard on 29 January 1942). From the beginning and for many years there was no regular host: it was presented live by the day’s duty continuity announcer. As a consequence, there are no recordings of the programme in the BBC archives from before the 1980s. 

In December 1964 it was transferred to the BBC Third Programme, beginning at 9.04am on weekdays. The title was quietly changed to Composer of the Week on 18 January 1988. From 9 October 1995 Composer of the Week was moved from its long-standing 9am slot to 12 noon, making way for a new morning schedule at Radio 3.

Notable episodes
 
 The first composer chosen, on 2 August 1943, was Mozart, followed over the following four weeks by Beethoven, Schubert, Bach and Haydn. 
 Vaughan Williams was the first living composer to be featured, on 7 February 1944.
 The first group composer episodes were ‘The Elizabethans’ from 14 February 1944, followed by 'Three Seventeenth-Century Masters’ (Lully, Couperin and Rameau) the following week. John Ireland and Arnold Bax were joint composers on 6 March 1944, followed by Benjamin Britten and William Walton on 27 March 1944.
 The first composer to be chosen for a second set of episodes was Schumann - first series 6 September 1943, second series 26 June 1944. Mozart was chosen for the second time on 10 July 1944. From then on the majority of choices were repeats, suggesting a core repertoire of around 60 composers.
 In July 2014 the first of a series of live editions with the BBC National Orchestra of Wales was broadcast to commemorate the 70th anniversary of the programme.
 In 2020 the Beethoven Unleashed series of 25 weekly editions (broadcast on alternate weeks) marked the 250th anniversary of the composer's birth. There were 125 programmes in total, including a final personal highlights selection by Donald Macleod to conclude the series.

References

External links
 Composer of the Week, BBC website
 Except from a 1988 edition of This Week's Composer on Mozart

1942 radio programme debuts
BBC Home Service programmes
BBC Radio 3 programmes
British music radio programmes
British talk radio programmes